Werner De Spoelberch (24 January 1902 – 10 September 1987) was a Belgian alpine skier. He competed in the men's combined event at the 1936 Winter Olympics.

References

1902 births
1987 deaths
Belgian male alpine skiers
Olympic alpine skiers of Belgium
Alpine skiers at the 1936 Winter Olympics
Sportspeople from Brussels